Danger Zone is the seventh album by French musician Lord Kossity, released in 2006 on the label U.M.G.

Track listing

Chart

References

2006 albums
Lord Kossity albums